Detlef Bruckhoff (born 8 April 1958) is a German former professional footballer who played as a forward. He made a total of 16 Bundesliga appearances for Tennis Borussia Berlin and Darmstadt 98.

References

External links 
 

1958 births
Living people
German footballers
Association football forwards
Bundesliga players
2. Bundesliga players
Tennis Borussia Berlin players
SV Darmstadt 98 players
TSV 1860 Munich players
German expatriate footballers
German expatriate sportspeople in Austria
Expatriate footballers in Austria
20th-century German people